Gerda Matilda Eleonora Johansson (later Wranné, 14 March 1891 – 10 April 1965) was a Swedish diver. She competed in the 1912 Summer Olympics, but was eliminated in the first round of the 10 m platform event.

References

1891 births
1965 deaths
Swedish female divers
Olympic divers of Sweden
Divers at the 1912 Summer Olympics
Divers from Stockholm
Stockholms KK divers